Elson Ferreira de Souza (born 30 October 1989), commonly known as Elsinho, is a Brazilian footballer who plays as a right back for Japanese club Tokushima Vortis.

Club career
On 28 April 2022, Elsinho signed with Tokushima Vortis.

Club statistics

Honours
Kawasaki Frontale
J1 League: 2017, 2018

Individual
J.League Best XI: 2017, 2018

References

External links

Profile at Kawasaki Frontale

1989 births
People from Porto Velho
Living people
Brazilian footballers
Association football fullbacks
Clube do Remo players
Clube de Regatas Brasil players
Tombense Futebol Clube players
Figueirense FC players
CR Vasco da Gama players
América Futebol Clube (MG) players
Kawasaki Frontale players
Shimizu S-Pulse players
Tokushima Vortis players
Campeonato Brasileiro Série A players
Campeonato Brasileiro Série B players
J1 League players
Brazilian expatriate footballers
Expatriate footballers in Japan
Brazilian expatriate sportspeople in Japan
Sportspeople from Rondônia